E-commerce in Bangladesh refers to the electronic commerce sector of Bangladesh business.

History
In 2009 Bangladesh Bank approved online payment and in 2013 the bank approved the use of debit and credit card for online payment. The eCommerce Association of Bangladesh is the trade body for eCommerce in Bangladesh. According to the association, there are 8,000 eCommerce pages in Facebook alone. The growth of the industry has been inhibited by low usage of credit and debit cards, and the unavailability of PayPal. In 2016 the government of Bangladesh opened eCommerce sites for every district in the country.  The same year, FBCCI recommended removal of tax on eCommerce. Ten billion Taka worth of transactions take place through eCommerce site per year according to a 2017 report.

Current market trends 
Currently, the following four types of eCommerce are popular in Bangladesh:

 Business-to-business (B2B)
 Business-to-consumer (B2C)
 Consumer-to-consumer (C2C)
 Business-to-employees (B2E)

Business-to-business 
There are number of company that offer office supplies, stationery, computers, cleaning, chemical for other companies.

Business to consumers
The Business-to-consumer segment grew through the growth of home-delivery of food. There are other companies based on Facebook that allow people in Bangladesh to buy products from the United States, the United Kingdom and India. The majority of the transactions are carried out through cash on delivery. A wide list of business like Daraz, already hitting the booming B2C e-commerce business model including social commerce where entrepreneurs uses Facebook or Instagram to sell to customers.

Consumer to consumer
There are a number of companies that act as classifieds, including Bikroy.

Business to employee
There are a number of websites that host information about jobs in Bangladesh.

E-commerce list in Bangladesh 
There are more than 35+ e-commerce websites in Bangladesh in 2022. Top popular e-commerce site in Bangladesh:

 Chaldal
 rokomari
 Pickaboo
 Foodpanda

Digital marketing 
Digital Marketing is a recent sector that has experienced rapid growth. Since 2014 twenty companies have started as the nation's digital marketplace emerges. Unlike traditional marketing, digital marketing involves strategies designed to engage consumers and drive brand conversation on various digital platforms.

The digital marketing industry in the nation has not matured with consumers having low online literacy rate. The industry has doubled in size due to increase to mobile transactions, an estimated 70 billion taka are transferred through mobile phones every month. Bangladesh has the tenth-largest mobile phone user base in the world and has sixty million internet connections. Zunaid Ahmed Palak the state minister for ICT in the Best of Global Digital Marketing World Tour 2016 which was held in Dhaka, "I am happy to say that from today we will speak about digital marketing as being an essential part of Digital Bangladesh." Bangladesh has sixty-five million internet users, about forty percent of the population. A Digital Marketing Summit is organized annually since 2013 by the Bangladesh Brand Forum.

References